Fine and Mellow is an album by vocalist Etta Jones which was recorded in 1986 and released on the Muse label.

Track listing
 "I Laughed at Love" (Abner Silver, Benny Davis) – 4:13
 "My Foolish Heart" (Victor Young, Ned Washington) – 4:37
 "I May Be Wrong (but I Think You're Wonderful)" (Henry Sullivan, Harry Ruskin) – 4:25
 "I Want a Little Boy" (Murray Mencher, Billy Moll) – 4:18
 "Don't Worry 'bout Me" (Rube Bloom, Ted Koehler) – 4:30
 "Orange Colored Sky" (Milton DeLugg, Willie Stein) – 3:59
 "Fine and Mellow" (Billie Holiday) – 7:17

Personnel
Etta Jones – vocals
Houston Person – tenor saxophone
Stan Hope  – piano
Peter Weiss – bass
Cecil Brooks III – drums

References

Muse Records albums
Etta Jones albums
Albums recorded at Van Gelder Studio
1987 albums